Alatau or Ala-Too is a generic name for a number of mountain ranges in Central Asia, characterized by interleaving areas of vegetation, scattered rocks and snows.

Notable mountain ranges that share the name include:

Kuznetsk Alatau, a mountain range in South Siberia, Russia
Several ranges of the Tien Shan 
 Dzungarian Alatau, North Tien Shan, Kazakhstan/China
 Kungey Alatau, West Tien-Shan, Kazakhstan/Kyrgyzstan
 Kyrgyz Alatau, West Tien Shan, Kazakhstan/Kyrgyzstan
 Talas Alatau, West Tien Shan, Kazakhstan/Kyrgyzstan/Uzbekistan
 Terskey Alatau, South Tien Shan, Kyrgyzstan
 Trans-Ili Alatau, West Tien Shan, Kazakhstan/Kyrgyzstan

See also 
 Alatau T. Atkinson
 Aladağ (disambiguation)
 Alatau (disambiguation)

Mountain ranges of Kyrgyzstan
Mountain ranges of Kazakhstan